Ben Powell (born 1984) is an Australian motorcycle speedway rider.

Ben Powell may also refer to:
Benjamin Powell (born 1978), American economist
Benjamin E. Powell  (1905–1981), American librarian
Benny Powell (1930–2010), African-American jazz trombonist
Benny R. Powell, American comic book author and businessman